"Lolita", subtitled "Serenata spagnola"  ("Spanish Serenade"), is an Italian song written by Arturo Buzzi-Peccia.

The performers of this song included Enrico Caruso, Beniamino Gigli, Mario Lanza, and Luciano Pavarotti.

References

External links 
 

1892 songs
Mario Lanza songs
1951 singles